Athletes from the Federal People's Republic of Yugoslavia competed at the 1952 Summer Olympics in Helsinki, Finland. 87 competitors, 77 men and 10 women, took part in 48 events in 11 sports.

Medalists

Athletics

Boxing

Canoeing

Football

Gymnastics

Rowing

Yugoslavia had 13 male rowers participate in two out of seven rowing events in 1952.

 Men's coxless four
 Duje Bonačić
 Velimir Valenta
 Mate Trojanović
 Petar Šegvić

 Men's eight
 Ladislav Matetić
 Branko Belačić
 Vladimir Horvat
 Vojko Šeravić
 Karlo Pavlenč
 Boris Beljak
 Stanko Despot
 Drago Husjak
 Zdenko Bego (cox)

Sailing

Shooting

Six shooters represented Yugoslavia in 1952.

50 m pistol
 Edvard Delorenco
 Rudolf Vuk

300 m rifle, three positions
 Jovan Kratohvil
 Stjepan Prauhardt

50 m rifle, three positions
 Zlatko Mašek
 Nemanja Marković

50 m rifle, prone
 Nemanja Marković
 Zlatko Mašek

Swimming

Water polo

Wrestling

References

External links
Official Olympic Reports
International Olympic Committee results database

Nations at the 1952 Summer Olympics
1952
1952 in Yugoslav sport